Bruna Pamela Lotufo (born April 7, 1984) is a Brazilian rugby sevens player. She won a bronze medal at the 2015 Pan American Games as a member of the Brazil women's national rugby sevens team.

References

External links
 Bruna Pamela Lotufo at BrasilRugby.com.br

1984 births
Living people
Brazilian female rugby union players
Brazilian female rugby league players
Brazil women's national rugby league team players
Brazil international rugby sevens players
Female rugby sevens players
Rugby sevens players at the 2015 Pan American Games
Pan American Games bronze medalists for Brazil
Place of birth missing (living people)
Pan American Games medalists in rugby sevens
Medalists at the 2015 Pan American Games
Brazil international women's rugby sevens players
Brazilian rugby sevens players